Stealing Summers is a 2011 American drama film directed by David Martin Porras, written by Matt Lester, and starring Wilson Bethel, Sophie Auster, James Jagger, and Mariano Martinez. It was filmed on location in Buenos Aires, and premiered at the 2011 Seminci (also known as Semana Internacional de Cine de Valladolid or Valladolid International Film Festival) in Valladolid, Spain.

Plot
Two twenty-something expatriates (Wilson Bethel and James Jagger) spending an indolent summer in Buenos Aires meet a beautiful American girl (Sophie Auster) who reveals a stash of illicit money hidden at her Argentine boyfriend’s (Mariano Martinez) apartment. Dreaming of freedom and never having to return home, the three plot to steal the cash during the weekend of the Superclásico, the epic football derby between bitter rivals Boca and River. One needs the money. One wants the money. Both love the girl. But what starts as a kind of game quickly turns violent, and as passions erupt, the three Americans find themselves on the verge of consequences none of them ever expected.

External links 
 Official site
 

2011 films
Films shot in Buenos Aires
American drama films
2011 drama films
2010s English-language films
2010s American films